Carla Jan Walker was an American homicide victim abducted from a bowling alley parking lot in Fort Worth, Texas on February 17, 1974. Her body was found three days later in a drainage ditch just 30 minutes south of Fort Worth.

Case history

Kidnapping and murder
On the evening of February 17, 1974, Walker was sitting with her boyfriend, Rodney McCoy, in his car in the parking lot of Brunswick Ridglea Bowl after attending a dance at Western Hills High School. The car door suddenly swung open and the two were assaulted by an unknown assailant, who dropped the magazine from his gun during the attack. McCoy was pistol-whipped and rendered unconscious. His last memory of the incident is Walker being grabbed and taken by the unknown male, whom he described as a white man, about 5 feet 10 inches tall, as she screamed for help. Walker was nowhere to be seen after McCoy regained consciousness. McCoy immediately went to Walker's house to inform her parents following the incident.

The police were called and searched the area where she had been abducted. Her purse and the magazine clip were the only items recovered in the parking lot. On February 20, 1974, her  body was found in a culvert in Lake Benbrook. The autopsy revealed that Walker had been alive for 2 days following her abduction, and she had been beaten, tortured, raped, and strangled to death. Toxicology reports also showed she had been injected with morphine. The police had several suspects in mind during the initial investigation and were able to obtain samples of bodily fluids from the crime scene; Walker's dress and other clothing were also preserved. However, adequate technology to use such samples to identify the killer did not exist in the 1970s. A mysterious letter by a person claiming to know the killer was among the few pieces of evidence received and released by the police department.

Police investigations
The murder remained a cold case for 46 years until September 2020, when DNA evidence recovered from Walker's clothing was sent to Othram Inc., who specialize in degraded DNA samples; the Oxygen network paid for the testing. Leads from Othram and a follow-up investigation by Detectives Wagner and Bennett led to the identification of 77-year old Glen Samuel McCurley as a suspect in the crime; McCurley had been interviewed by police shortly after the murder, as he had purchased a .22 Ruger pistol that used the same magazine as the one dropped in the parking lot of Brunswick Ridglea Bowl, but claimed the gun had been stolen from his truck. He agreed to take a polygraph test, and after he passed it, he was eliminated as a suspect. In 2020, police obtained DNA samples from the trash receptacle outside his home. After confirming that the sample matched the suspect's DNA, investigators interviewed McCurley, who agreed to provide a cheek swab. The matching of the samples were enough to arrest and charge him with the crime.

McCurley went on trial in August 2021. The evidence presented in court included the .22 Ruger pistol McCurley had claimed was stolen in 1974, which had been found concealed inside his home. On the third day of the trial, McCurley changed his plea to guilty and was sentenced to life in prison. McCurley is currently imprisoned in Gib Lewis Unit and will be eligible for parole on March 21, 2029. As of 2022, he has not admitted to killing Walker, telling reporter Skip Hollandsworth that he pled guilty because, “I’d had enough hounding." Investigators believe McCurley may have been involved in the rapes and murders of several other young women in the Fort Worth area in the 1970s and 1980s, although he has not been charged with any additional crimes.

See also
Fort Worth Missing Trio - Unsolved case from the same year and city
Disappearance of Michaela Garecht - Previously thirty-two-year-old unsolved case
List of solved missing person cases
Murder of Reyna Marroquín - Previously thirty-year-old unsolved case

References

1970s missing person cases
1974 in Texas
1974 murders in the United States
Child abuse resulting in death
Child sexual abuse in the United States
Deaths by person in Texas
February 1974 events in the United States
Female murder victims
Formerly missing people
History of women in Texas
Incidents of violence against girls
Kidnapped American children
Missing person cases in Texas
Murdered American children
Violence against women in the United States